Timothy Moore Twigden (born 14 May 1952) is a former New Zealand rugby union player. A wing and centre, Twigden represented Auckland at a provincial level, and was a member of the New Zealand national side, the All Blacks, in 1979 and 1980. He played 15 matches for the All Blacks including two internationals.
Tim and his twin brother Greg were prominent surf life saving beach sprint champions competing at national level in this sport.

References

1952 births
Living people
People educated at Auckland Grammar School
New Zealand rugby union players
New Zealand international rugby union players
Auckland rugby union players
Rugby union wings
Rugby union centres
Rugby union players from Manawatū-Whanganui